The first USS Mist was a steamer purchased by the Union Navy during the American Civil War. She was planned by the Union Navy for use as a gunboat stationed off Confederate waterways to prevent their trading with foreign countries.

Mist, a stern wheel steamer built at Allegheny, Pennsylvania, in 1864, was purchased at Cincinnati, Ohio, 23 December 1864, and commissioned at Mound City, Illinois, 3 March 1865, Acting Master W. E. H. Fontress in command.

Assigned to the Mississippi Squadron 

Mist was converted into a gunboat during the first 4 months of 1865. The new tinclad was assigned to the 8th District, Mississippi Squadron and patrolled the river protecting steamers and river settlements from desperadoes.

End-of-war decommissioning, sale, and subsequent civilian career 

Mist was removed from naval duty 4 August; decommissioned at Mound City and was sold at public auction to C. C. Hutchinson 17 August 1865. Documented as a merchant ship, she served American commerce on the Mississippi River and its tributaries until 1874.

References 

Ships of the Union Navy
Ships built in Pennsylvania
Gunboats of the United States Navy
Steamships of the United States Navy
1864 ships